New York's 42nd State Assembly district is one of the 150 districts in the New York State Assembly. It has been represented by Brooklyn Democratic Party chair Rodneyse Bichotte Hermelyn since 2015.

Geography
The district includes portions of East Flatbush, Flatbush, Ditmas Park, and Midwood, in Brooklyn.

Recent election results

2022

2020

2018

2016

2014

2012

References

Politics of Brooklyn
42